Trevor Prangley (born 24 August 1972) is a South African mixed martial artist. He has fought in the UFC, Strikeforce, Bellator, Dream, King of the Cage, MFC, the SFL, Shark Fights, and Bodog Fight. He competed in the Middleweight and Light Heavyweight divisions. He was the former King of the Cage Light Heavyweight Champion, the former Shark Fights Light Heavyweight Champion, and the former MFC Light Heavyweight Champion.

Mixed martial arts career

Early life
Born in Cape Town, South Africa in 1972, Prangley grew up on a small farm tending horses, sheep, and chickens with his mother, father, brother, and sister. When Trevor was only 4 years old, his father asked him if he wanted to sign-up for wrestling classes at a local club. He didn't know it then, but that was the beginning of a long career in wrestling.

Trevor wrestled throughout his youth in South Africa. He won numerous regional and provincial titles and at age 23 captured the national title. This brought him close to his goal of making the South African Olympic team, but he lost the qualifying match in overtime and had to settle for alternate status. Disappointed and dissatisfied with the level of training he was receiving, Trevor decided to go to the United States to further his Olympic dreams.

He left his family behind and headed to Coeur d'Alene, Idaho. His hope was to make the lineup and secure a scholarship at North Idaho College (NIC), a local community college. This gamble paid off. Trevor received All-American status both years at NIC. Unfortunately, during the final match of his second year while ahead on points, Trevor tore his ACL and placed runner up. Frustrated that his eligibility was gone and he had not reached his goal of becoming a national champion, Trevor considered returning home to South Africa. Those thoughts soon disappeared as he began to receive numerous scholarship offers to continue wrestling at four-year schools. He was now motivated to begin aggressive rehab.

Despite doctor's predictions that it would be nine months before being able to wrestle again, Trevor found a local Jiu-Jitsu school and began to train. Jiu-Jitsu enabled him to stay in shape and still have something to compete in while recovering. Just six months later, in 1998, he had his first amateur mixed martial arts fight. Even though he lost this fight to decision, he realized that mixed martial arts was the sport for him. He canceled his plans to resume college wrestling and went on a 19 fight winning streak before turning pro in 2001.

Early career
His pro-career started as a Light Heavyweight at 205 pounds. He achieved six straight wins before fighting Renato Sobral, his toughest fight to date. It was losing this fight that made Trevor decided to move to middleweight 185 lbs. He decided to drop to a middleweight where he could feel more comfortable and strong. This proved to be a good decision. Trevor won his first fight at 185 pounds over Andrei Semenov of Russia and secured a fight in the UFC.

Ultimate Fighting Championship
He made his debut in the UFC at UFC 48, defeating Curtis Stout by submission.  He is currently 2–2 in the organization, including a close decision loss to Jeremy Horn at UFC 56. Prangley then went on to lose to Chael Sonnen at Ultimate Fight Night 4.

Post-UFC
Leaving the UFC, Prangley then fought for several organizations, including Bodog Fight, where he qualified for the USA vs. Russia card on the reality show, and defeated Andrei Seminov for a second time at the event.

Prangley defeated Yuki Kondo at BodogFIGHT: Alvarez vs. Lee via TKO (doctor stoppage) following the conclusion of the second round to win the Bodog Fight Middleweight Title.

Strikeforce
He has fought several times for Strikeforce, which included competing in the Strikeforce: Four Men Enter, One Man Survives middleweight tournament. He won a decision victory over Falaniko Vitale in the first round of the tournament, but lost to Jorge Santiago in the finals.

Prangley fought Tim Kennedy on 16 June 2010 at Strikeforce: Los Angeles. and lost by submission (rear naked choke).

After this, he faced Keith Jardine in a non-title bout at Shark Fights 13: Jardine vs. Prangley. He won via split decision.

On 29 January he fought in Strikeforce again and lost by a rear naked choke from Roger Gracie in the first round.

Shark fights
In between his time with Strikeforce Prangley competed for the Shark Fights organization and won the Light Heavyweight Championship by defeating Marcus Sursa on 28 November 2009 at Shark Fights 7.

He later fought in the main event of the Shark Fights 13 card by defeating Keith Jardine in a non-title fight on 11 September 2010.

Bellator
Prangley made his Bellator debut at Bellator 58, against Hector Lombard at the catch weight of 195. In this non-title affair, Prangley lost to Lombard via TKO in the second round.

Super Fight League
He next compete at India's Super Fight League's third event, SFL 3, against Baga Agaev. He won via third round KO.
He was expected to face Sokoudjou at SFL 5 in the main event.

King of the Cage
Prangley fought Tony Lopez for the vacant KOTC Light Heavyweight Championship at KOTC: Vigilante. The fight was stopped in the fourth round after Lopez landed an illegal knee to Prangley's head and Prangley could not continue even after the 5 minutes allowed to recover. The bout then went to a technical decision where the judges scored a Majority Decision victory for Prangley.

Prangley made his fourth title defense when he faced Jared Torgeson at KOTC: Double Impact on 4 October 2013. He won the fight via unanimous decision.

In his fifth title defense, Prangley faced Jared Torgeson in a rematch at KOTC: Steadfast on 14 August 2014. Prangley won via KO in the first round.

In his sixth title defense, Prangley faced Richard Blake at KOTC: Tactical Strike on 13 November 2014.  He successfully defended his title, winning by submission early in the first round.

Other promotions
Filling in for an injured Mike Kyle, Prangley faced Maxim Grishin at Fight Nights: Battle of Moscow 17 on 30 September 2014. He lost the fight via TKO in the second round.

Personal life
Trevor and his wife have a son.

Achievements and Titles

Wrestling
NJCAA Division 1 Wrestler
2x All-American
NJCAA National Runner-Up
South African National Champion

Mixed martial arts
BodogFight
BodogFight Middleweight Championship (One time)
Maximum Fighting Championship
MFC Light Heavyweight Championship (One time)
Shark Fights
Shark Fights Light Heavyweight Championship (One time, current)
Super Fight League
Fight of the Night (One time)
King of the Cage
KOTC Light Heavyweight Championship (One time, current)
Strikeforce
Strikeforce Middleweight Tournament Runner-Up

Mixed martial arts record

|-
| Draw
| align=center| 34–11–2
| Mike Hayes
| Draw (split)
| King of the Cage: Awakening
| 
| align=center| 3
| align=center| 5:00
| Worley, Idaho, United States
| 
|-
| Win
| align=center| 34–11–1
| Richard Blake
| Submission (arm-triangle choke)
| KOTC: Tactical Strike
| 
| align=center| 1
| align=center| 2:07
| Worley, Idaho, United States
|  
|-
| Loss
| align=center| 33–11–1
| Maxim Grishin
| TKO (punches)
| Fight Nights Global: Battle of Moscow 17
| 
| align=center| 2
| align=center| 2:56
| Moscow, Russia
| 
|-
| Win
| align=center| 33–10–1
| Jared Torgeson
| KO (punches)
| KOTC: Steadfast
| 
| align=center| 1
| align=center| 1:07
| Worley, Idaho, United States
| 
|-
| Win
| align=center| 32–10–1
| Jared Torgeson
| Decision (unanimous)
| KOTC: Double Impact
| 
| align=center| 5
| align=center| 5:00
| Worley, Idaho, United States
| 
|-
| Loss
| align=center| 31–10–1
| Vyacheslav Vasilevsky
| TKO (punches)
| League s-70: Plotforma S -70
| 
| align=center| 3
| align=center| 2:32
| Sochi, Russia
| 
|-
| Win
| align=center| 31–9–1
| Tony Lopez
| Submission (armbar)
| KOTC: It's Personal
| 
| align=center| 2
| align=center| 3:41 
| Worley, Idaho, United States
| 
|-
| Win
| align=center| 30–9–1
| Dan Molina
| Submission (kimura)
| KOTC: Fighting Legends
| 
| align=center| 3
| align=center| 2:06
| Oroville, California, United States
| 
|-
| Win
| align=center| 29–9–1
| Brandon Anderson
| Submission (kimura)
| KOTC: Free Fall 2
| 
| align=center| 1
| align=center| 2:54
| Coeur d'Alene, Idaho, United States
| 
|-
| Win
| align=center| 28–9–1
| Tony Lopez
| Technical Decision (majority)
| KOTC: Vigilante
| 
| align=center| 4
| align=center| 1:10
| Highland, California, United States
| 
|-
| Win
| align=center| 27–9–1
| Mike Cook
| TKO (doctor stoppage)
| KOTC: Breaking Point
| 
| align=center| 1
| align=center| 5:00
| Worley, Idaho, United States
| 
|-
| Win
| align=center| 26–9–1
| George Stork
| Submission (rear-naked choke)
| KOTC: Wild Card
| 
| align=center| 3
| align=center| 2:42
| Worley, Idaho, United States
| 
|-
| Win
| align=center| 25–9–1
| Baga Agaev
| KO (punches)
| Super Fight League 3
| 
| align=center| 3
| align=center| 2:03
| New Delhi, Delhi, India
| 
|-
|-
| Loss
| align=center| 24–9–1
| Hector Lombard
| TKO (punches)
| Bellator 58
| 
| align=center| 2
| align=center| 1:06
| Hollywood, Florida, United States
| 
|-
| Win
| align=center| 24–8–1
| Tony King
| KO (punch)
| North Idaho Fight Night
| 
| align=center| 1
| align=center| 0:37
| Idaho, United States
| 
|-
| Loss
| align=center| 23–8–1
| Tatsuya Mizuno
| KO (knee to the body)
| Dream: Japan GP Final
| 
| align=center| 1
| align=center| 4:41
| Tokyo, Japan
| 
|-
| Loss
| align=center| 23–7–1
| Roger Gracie
| Submission (rear-naked choke)
| Strikeforce: Diaz vs. Cyborg
| 
| align=center| 1
| align=center| 4:19
| San Jose, California, United States
| 
|-
| Win
| align=center| 23–6–1
| Keith Jardine
| Decision (split)
| Shark Fights 13: Jardine vs Prangley
| 
| align=center| 3
| align=center| 5:00
| Amarillo, Texas, United States
| 
|-
| Loss
| align=center| 22–6–1
| Tim Kennedy
| Submission (rear-naked choke)
| Strikeforce: Los Angeles
| 
| align=center| 1
| align=center| 3:35
| Los Angeles, California, United States
| 
|-
| Draw
| align=center| 22–5–1
| Karl Amoussou
| Technical Draw
| Strikeforce Challengers: Kaufman vs. Hashi
| 
| align=center| 1
| align=center| 4:14
| San Jose, California, United States
| 
|-
| Win
| align=center| 22–5
| Marcus Sursa
| Submission (rear-naked choke)
| Shark Fights 7: Sursa vs Prangley
| 
| align=center| 1
| align=center| 4:40
| Amarillo, Texas, United States
| 
|-
| Win
| align=center| 21–5
| Dennis Reed
| KO (punch)
| Arena Rumble: Horn vs. Guida
| 
| align=center| 1
| align=center| 0:20
| Spokane, Washington, United States
| 
|-
| Win
| align=center| 20–5
| Emanuel Newton
| Decision (unanimous)
| MFC 21
| 
| align=center| 5
| align=center| 5:00
| Enoch, Alberta, Canada
| 
|-
| Win
| align=center| 19–5
| Isidro Gonzalez
| Submission (rear-naked choke)
| Professional Fighting Association: Champion vs. Champion
| 
| align=center| 1
| align=center| 3:41
| Coeur D'Alene, Idaho, United States
| 
|-
| Win
| align=center| 18–5
| Anthony Ruiz
| Decision (unanimous)
| Strikeforce: At The Mansion II
| 
| align=center| 3
| align=center| 5:00
| Los Angeles, California, United States
| 
|-
| Loss
| align=center| 17–5
| Jorge Santiago
| KO (knee to the body)
| Strikeforce: Four Men Enter, One Man Survives
| 
| align=center| 1
| align=center| 2:31
| San Jose, California, United States
| 
|-
| Win
| align=center| 17–4
| Falaniko Vitale
| Decision (referee decision)
| Strikeforce: Four Men Enter, One Man Survives
| 
| align=center| 2
| align=center| 2:12
| San Jose, California, United States
| 
|-
| Win
| align=center| 16–4
| Yuki Kondo
| TKO (doctor stoppage)
| BodogFight: Alvarez vs Lee
| 
| align=center| 2
| align=center| 5:00
| Trenton, New Jersey, United States
| 
|-
| Win
| align=center| 15–4
| Pierre Guillet
| Submission (rear-naked choke)
| BodogFight: Costa Rica
| 
| align=center| 1
| align=center| 1:50
| Costa Rica
| 
|-
| Win
| align=center| 14–4
| Andrei Semenov
| Decision (unanimous)
| BodogFight: USA vs Russia
| 
| align=center| 3
| align=center| 5:00
| Vancouver, British Columbia, Canada
| 
|-
| Win
| align=center| 13–4
| Anthony Ruiz
| Submission (armbar)
| Strikeforce: Tank vs. Buentello
| 
| align=center| 1
| align=center| 4:42
| Fresno, California, United States
| 
|-
| Win
| align=center| 12–4
| Kyacey Uscola
| Submission (arm-triangle)
| BodogFight: Costa Rica
| 
| align=center| 2
| align=center| 0:35
| Costa Rica
| 
|-
| Loss
| align=center| 11–4
| Chael Sonnen
| Decision (unanimous)
| UFC Fight Night 4
| 
| align=center| 3
| align=center| 5:00
| Las Vegas, Nevada, United States
| 
|-
| Loss
| align=center| 11–3
| Jeremy Horn
| Decision (unanimous)
| UFC 56
| 
| align=center| 3
| align=center| 5:00
| Las Vegas, Nevada, United States
| 
|-
| Win
| align=center| 11–2
| Travis Lutter
| Decision (unanimous)
| UFC 54
| 
| align=center| 3
| align=center| 5:00
| Las Vegas, Nevada, United States
| 
|-
| Win
| align=center| 10–2
| Matt Horwich
| Decision (unanimous)
| SportFight 9: Respect
| 
| align=center| 3
| align=center| 5:00
| Gresham, Oregon, United States
| 
|-
| Loss
| align=center| 9–2
| Rico Hattingh
| Submission (triangle choke)
| African FC: All or Nothing
| 
| align=center| 3
| align=center| 4:40
| Cape Town, South Africa
| 
|-
| Win
| align=center| 9–1
| Curtis Stout
| Submission (cobra choke)
| UFC 48
| 
| align=center| 2
| align=center| 1:05
| Las Vegas, Nevada, United States
| 
|-
| Win
| align=center| 8–1
| Andrei Semenov
| Decision (unanimous)
| Euphoria: Russia vs USA
| 
| align=center| 3
| align=center| 5:00
| Atlantic City, New Jersey, United States
| 
|-
| Win
| align=center| 7–1
| Shane Schartzer
| TKO (submission to punches)
| Kickdown Classic 8
| 
| align=center| 1
| align=center| 1:31
| Denver, Colorado, United States
| 
|-
| Loss
| align=center| 6–1
| Renato Sobral
| Decision (unanimous)
| International FC: Global Domination
| 
| align=center| 3
| align=center| 5:00
| Denver, Colorado, United States
| 
|-
| Win
| align=center| 6–0
| Chael Sonnen
| Submission (armbar)
| Xtreme Fighting Alliance 5: Redemption
| 
| align=center| 1
| align=center| 2:49
| West Palm Beach, Florida, United States
| 
|-
| Win
| align=center| 5–0
| Manny Valera
| TKO (punches)
| Cage Fight Monterrey: Ultimate Fighting
| 
| align=center| 3
| align=center| N/A
| Monterrey, Mexico
| 
|-
| Win
| align=center| 4–0
| Brett Shafer
| Decision (unanimous)
| Cage Fight Monterrey: Ultimate Fighting
| 
| align=center| 3
| align=center| 5:00
| Monterrey, Mexico
| 
|-
| Win
| align=center| 3–0
| Kyle Seals
| Decision (unanimous)
| Ultimate Athlete 3: Vengeance
| 
| align=center| 3
| align=center| 5:00
| Denver, Colorado, United States
| 
|-
| Win
| align=center| 2–0
| Darcy Landcaster
| KO (punches)
| Gladiators Vale Tudo
| 
| align=center| 1
| align=center| N/A
| Worley, Idaho, United States
| 
|-
| Win
| align=center| 1–0
| Joe Garcia
| Submission (kneebar)
| Bushido 1
| 
| align=center| 1
| align=center| N/A
| Tempe, Arizona, United States
|

See also
 List of current mixed martial arts champions
 List of male mixed martial artists

References

External links

1972 births
Living people
South African male mixed martial artists
Middleweight mixed martial artists
Light heavyweight mixed martial artists
Mixed martial artists utilizing collegiate wrestling
Mixed martial artists utilizing Muay Thai
South African practitioners of Brazilian jiu-jitsu
South African Muay Thai practitioners
South African male sport wrestlers
Sportspeople from Cape Town
White South African people
South African expatriates in the United States
Ultimate Fighting Championship male fighters